Fluellite is a mineral with the chemical formula Al2(PO4)F2(OH)•7H2O. The name is from its chemical composition, being a fluate of alumine (French).

It was first described in 1824 for an occurrence in the Stenna Gwyn Mine, St Stephen-in-Brannel, St Austell District, Cornwall, England.

It is a rare secondary mineral found in complex granite pegmatites where it forms by weathering of earlier phosphate minerals. It is found in association with fluorapatite, wavellite, phosphosiderite, strengite, aldermanite, cacoxenite, variscite, turquoise, fluorite and quartz.

References

Phosphate minerals
Orthorhombic minerals
Minerals in space group 70